Mao Inoue (born January 9, 1987) is a Japanese actress. She debuted as an actress when she was five years old. She is also known for her work in film such as, I Give My First Love to You, Rebirth, and The Snow White Murder Case.

Career

Dramas and films
Inoue Mao started her career as an actress when she was five years old. She has been in many dramas since then. The viewers took notice of her in the series Kids War which ran successfully from 1999 to 2003. In 2005, Mao took the lead role in the drama adaptation of the popular manga Hana Yori Dango, with Arashi member Matsumoto Jun, Shun Oguri, Shota Matsuda and Tsuyoshi Abe. Mao was awarded Best Actress by Television Drama Academy in the same year that the drama was aired.

In 2006, she co-starred in her first film: Check It Out, Yo! with Hayato Ichihara, Yūta Hiraoka, and Tasuku Emoto. The film was in theaters April 22, 2006.

In early 2007, Hana Yori Dango Returns aired and was better-received than the first season. In the same year, Inoue co-starred in the drama First Kiss with Check It Out, Yo! co-star Yūta Hiraoka. Her performances led to her the lead role in the drama special Hanaikusa as a maiko-turned-geisha.

In 2008, she played the lead role in a drama special Anmitsu Hime as a princess, followed by Anmitsu Hime 2 in the following year, where she sang the theme song with Shoko Nakagawa. After the success of the two Hana Yori Dango dramas, a film was announced in August 2007, just months after the end of the 2007 sequel. It was Inoue's first starring role in a film. The film was released on June 28, 2008. It topped the box office in Japan for several weeks and became the second fastest earning film in 2008. It was also successful in many parts of Asia, bringing the name "10 billion yen actress" to Inoue Mao.

Mao stepped back from acting to concentrate on her studies. Following her graduation from Meiji University in March 2009, she started filming for the film adaptation of the manga Boku no Hatsukoi wo Kimi ni Sasagu, in which she shared the lead with Masaki Okada; it was released in theaters in October 2009. In April of the following year, My Darling is a Foreigner was released in theaters with Inoue starring opposite Jonathan Sherr.

Three years after her last drama, she reunited with Hana Yori Dango co-star Shun Oguri for the drama , which began airing in October 2010. She also starred in the 84th asadora drama , portraying a young woman who lived through World War II in Nagano prefecture It was planned to air from March 28, 2011, to September 24, 2011, but it was delayed due to the earthquake and tsunami. It started to air on April 4, 2011. For her role, she won "Best Actress" in the 70th The Television Drama Academy Awards.

In February 2011, Mao costarred in a film starring Yutaka Takenouchi, called Taiheiyou no kiseki ~Fox to yobareta otoko (Oba: Miracle in the Pacific), about World War II holdout Captain Sakae Oba. Filming took place in Thailand. It was also announced in late September 2010 that Inoue Mao would star in the film Youkame no Semi which was released in April 2011. Both films were successful at the box office.  In Youkame no Semi (literally “eighth day cicada” but known in English as Rebirth, her portrayal of a daughter with a difficult past earned her several film awards, including her first "Best Starring Actress" Award in the 35th Japan Film Academy Awards.  The film also won nine other awards that year.

Inoue Mao was chosen to chair the Red team in the New Year's Eve Singing Contest Kōhaku Uta Gassen 2011. This team became the first female-led Red team to win the Kōuhaku Uta Gassen in seven years.

Because of her performance in Oba: Miracle in the Pacific, she was chosen to star in the comedy Tug of War!, which will be released in 2012.

It was announced in May 2012 that Inoue Mao would play the lead role in a summer drama called Tokkan Tokubetsu Kokuzei Choushukan, reuniting her with director Tsuna Hiichatta. The drama will air in July 2012.

She appeared alongside V6's member Junichi Okada and Haruma Miura in the war film Eien no Zero. Filming started June 2012 and released in December 2013. The film topped the Japan Box Office for 8 consecutive weeks and broke box office records. The film also won The Audience Award at the Udine Far East Film Festival.

It was announced that she would reunite with few of her costars and her Tug of War! director in the comedy film King of Apology, which was released in September 2013.

In March 2014, Inoue appeared in a leading role in the mystery suspense film The Snow White Murder Case, directed by Yoshihiro Nakamura.

June 2014, it was announced that Inoue would play the lead role of Sugi Fumi in the 2015 NHK taiga drama, Hana Moyu. As the series received historically low ratings during its run, Inoue took the blame for the low viewership, stating that "I am the starring actress, so it has to be from my lack of ability."

On August 23, 2017, after a year and a half hiatus, Mao Inoue made a drama comeback in a Fuji TV drama in fall titled School Counselor. Broadcast began on October 17, 2017. 

In 2019, Inoue starred in a comedic and cinematic period film Talking the Pictures and the special 5-episode NHK drama titled Boy Torajiro. The next year, On January 8, 2020, her movie titled Angry Rice Wives on which the story was set during the 1918 Rice Riots, was released on various cinemas in Japan. 

May 2020, it was confirmed that Inoue will have a full drama comeback in an NTV drama titled Pay To Ace alongside Yagira Yuya and Shigeaki Kato after one year of broadcast and filming delay. Broadcast will start in October 2020. It was announced that the drama series was originally scheduled to first air on July, 2020, but was postponed due to the COVID-20 outbreak.

Print and television endorsements
Aside from acting in films, Inoue has been chosen to represent Mizuho Bank and Chocola BB Eisai series, NTT fleet West and Asahi Breweries's Asahi Direct Shot. Regarding Asahi Beer Direct shot, Inoue Mao is collaborating with Tomohisa Yamashita. She also appears on the covers of various magazines, such as Bomb, Steady, Weekly Shonen, among others.

Voice acting
In 2014, Inoue debuted as a voice actress, providing the voice of Apple Boy in one of the Anpanman films. The anime film was released in July 2014.

Her next voice project was the animated film 3DCG Rudolph and Ippaiattena. It was announced on 31 July 2015. The film was released on August 6, 2016.

Stage
Inoue Mao was cast in a butai (stage play) called MIWA in 2013.

A new stage play starring Inoue was announced called Anger. It ran from January to April 2016.

Personal life
Inoue Mao revealed in one show that her mother encouraged her to join performing acts to learn at the age of 4. She was also learning music and arts. Acting wasn't her priority, but when she received her first fan letter, she decided to continue acting. Although she entered show business at an early age, she gave her school priority. In 2004, she rose in popularity from her role in the Kid’s War series. Despite this, she chose to put her acting on hold as she concentrated on graduating from the University of Japan. In 2005, at 18, Inoue enrolled in Meiji University, majoring in theater and literature; she chose Chinese as her second language elective. In her last year of college, she concentrated solely on her studies. In March 2009, she graduated from Meiji University.

Filmography

Television dramas

Films

Documentaries
2011: The Message of Life 100 Years Old Shigeaki Hinohara - Narration
2012: Nadeshiko Japan-30 Years of Japanese Women's Football - Narration
2012: Bright Woman- Featured in the documentary - Inoue Mao
2012: The Passion Continent - Interview with Oda Kazumasa
2013: Goal of a 13 Year Old. Even Kids Have Dreams - Narration
2014: NHK Special - "Takashi Yanase" Anpanman Life - Narration

Variety
2011: Kouhaku Uta Gassen- MC
2013: 36th Japanese Film Academy Awards- MC
2014: "JAPAN project Ikegami Akira"- Guide
2014: Kouhaku Uta Gassen- Judge

Stage
2002: Higuchi Ichiyō
2013: MIWA
2016: Anger

PV appearances
2007: Kazumasa Oda- "Kokoro"
2008-09: Amnitsu Hime PV-Inoue Mao "Diamonds"

Endorsements
Asahi Cream Brown Rice Bran
Lipovitan
PUMA Playtime
Asahi Breweries Asahi Direct Shot (2012 ~ present)
Sega Saturn Segata Sanshiro Christmas commercial (1996)
Glico Ice [real] (2010 ~ present)
NTT West FLET (2010 ~ present)
Mizuho Bank (2006 ~ present)
Eisai's Chocola BB [Series]
Panky (2007 ~ present)
KAGOME (2007 ~ present)
Dralion (2006 ~ present)
Kateikyoushi no Try (2006 ~ 2007)
Shirakabe Gura Mio Sparkling (2016 ~ )

Awards and nominations

Television and film

Other awards
2007 Nail Queen Actress Category
2009 22nd Japan Best Dressed Eyes Awards
2011 Fountain Pen Award

References

External links
Official Site
Inoue Mao Official Blog

1987 births
Japanese child actresses
Japanese film actresses
Japanese stage actresses
Japanese television actresses
Living people
Asadora lead actors
Actresses from Yokohama
Taiga drama lead actors
20th-century Japanese actresses
21st-century Japanese actresses